First Fidelity Bank is an American retail bank and financial services corporation which was chartered in Oklahoma in 1920. The bank is a subsidiary of First Fidelity Bancorp, which was founded in 1982. The bank is co-owned by Lee R. Symcox, his wife Suzanne Symcox, Bill Cameron and his sister Lynda Cameron. The bank is headquartered in Oklahoma City, and has 29 branches in Oklahoma, Arizona and Colorado. As of 2020, First Fidelity Bank has $2 billion in total assets.

History
First Fidelity Bank was founded in 1920 as the First State Bank of Norman. The bank was acquired in 1952 by the Symcox family. In 1981, the bank was chartered as Commercial Bank, National Association.

In 1992, First Fidelity Bank merged with City National Bank. The resulting bank, valued at $240 million, became Oklahoma's fifth largest bank at the time. In 2002, First Fidelity Bank expanded into Tulsa, and the bank opened its doors in Arizona in 2004. By 2006, First Fidelity Bank was ranked as the third largest bank in the Oklahoma City metropolitan area.

First Fidelity Bank continued to grow through a number of acquisitions between 2006 and 2013. The bank acquired Edmond Bank & Trust in 2006 and Western Security Bank in 2007. In 2010, First Fidelity Bank acquired $80 million in deposits from Home National Bank in Arizona. In 2013, First Fidelity Bank acquired Sunrise Bank of Arizona, adding its $202.2 million in total assets.

Operations
First Fidelity Bank is a retail bank headquartered in Oklahoma City, which operates in Oklahoma, Arizona and Colorado. It is a subsidiary of First Fidelity Bancorp, which was founded in 1982. As of 2020, the bank holds more than $2 billion in assets.

The bank was one of the first banks in the United States to launch a mobile deposit application, which it released in 2012. In 2014, the bank announced its intention to partner with Apple Pay.

Corporate
First Fidelity Bank is privately-held bank, whose owners comprise chairman Bill Cameron and his sister Lynda Cameron, in partnership with husband and wife Lee R. Symcox, the bank's president and chief executive officer, and Suzanne Symcox, executive vice president.

First Fidelity Bank became the jersey sponsor of United Soccer League professional men's team Oklahoma City Energy FC in its inaugural 2014 season.

See also
 American Fidelity Assurance

References

External links
 

Banks based in Oklahoma
Banks established in 1981
American companies established in 1981
1981 establishments in Oklahoma